Shandra Woworuntu is an Indonesian woman who is the former chair of the International Survivor of Trafficking Advisory Council to the OSCE - ODIHR and she was a member of the U.S. Advisory Council on Human Trafficking and a survivor of human trafficking and domestic violence.

Woworuntu was born in Indonesia, and in 2001 she traveled to the USA expecting a job in the hospitality industry but was instead forced into the sex industry and prostituted. She eventually escaped her captors and helped convict her traffickers. In 2009, Woworuntu was granted permanent residency in the US and became a U.S. citizen through naturalization.

On 20 March 2014, Governor Chris Christie appointed Woworuntu to be a Commission of Human Trafficking for the state of New Jersey. On 16 December 2015, President Obama appointed Woworuntu as one of 11 members of the U.S. Advisory Council on Human Trafficking and the council held their first meeting on 18 October 2016.

Woworuntu was curator of the Design and Violence published in 2015 by Museum of Modern Art, she laid the abuse of sexual exploitation and gun violence.

Woworuntu is the founder and CEO of the Mentari Human Trafficking Survivor Empowerment Program Inc.– an organization aimed at empowering human trafficking survivors in their reintegration back into community, and society independently through the DREAM, Direct Services, Resources, Empowerment, Advocacy, and Mentorship.

As a survivor leader, Woworuntu is devoted to helping other survivors through an empowerment program. In 2017, Woworuntu was recognized as the L’Oréal Paris Women of Worth National Honoree through a public vote and rewarded her with a $35,000 contribution for Mentari to continue making a difference in the lives of sex-trafficking survivors. As a survivor advocate and lobbyist, she help to pass local and federal anti-trafficking legislation and was recognized as the 2020 Power of Diversity the most influential 100 Asian American in New York Politics and Policy. She was recognized to become Power Diversity Asian 100: New York’s Asian American leaders, and she received recognition from the NYC Mayor's office to End Domestic and Gender-Based Violence as a 2021 Advocate of New York City. In 2022, she was recognized to become The 2022 Power of Diversity Asian 100: New York’s Asian American trailblazers. In 2023, She became a board member of the Freedom Business Alliance.

References 

Living people
Anti-domestic violence activists
Anti–human trafficking activists
Human trafficking in the United States
Indonesian emigrants to the United States
Forced prostitution in the United States
Year of birth missing (living people)
Victims of forced prostitution
Indonesian curators
Founders
21st-century American women
American curators
Violence against women in Indonesia